Kontagora is a major town on the south bank of the Kontagora River in north-west Niger State, Nigeria. It is the capital city of the Kontagora Emirate.
The current Niger state governor, Alh. Abubakar Sani Bello hails from Kontagora. 
On December 15, 1995, the Roman Catholic Apostolic Vicariate of Kontagora was established here.  St Michael's Cathedral is the seat of the apostolic vicar.

References

External links
Map from MSN Encarta

Local Government Areas in Niger State
Populated places in Niger State